Sientje Sondakh Mandey (born 23 April 1966), is an Indonesian politician, journalist, and newspaper editor, who served as a member of the Regional Representative Council from 2004 until 2009. Born in Palu, Central Sulawesi, he only graduated from the Public Senior High School 57 Jakarta, before discontinuing his education. Instead, he became the Program Manager of Radio "Nebula FM ” based in Palu. From 1990, he served as the editor of the National Suluh Weekly, also based Palu.

From 2002 until 2004, he served as President Director of Ranah Multi Media Jakarta. In 2004, he ran for a seat in the upper Regional Representative Council (DPD) in the 2004 Indonesian legislative election. In the election, he placed third, with 101,660 votes, and received a seat, representing Central Sulawesi. As a senator, he viewed the DPD as a minimal response to the disparity between the central government and the outer regions. He left office in 2009, but he remained active in politics.

References 

Members of the Regional Representative Council
1966 births
People from Palu
Living people